Boardy Barn was a bar located in The Hamptons in New York. The bar was only open on Sundays in the summer from mid-May to the Sunday after Labor Day during the hours of 2pm to 8pm. Every week, about 2,000 patrons visit the venue's party tent.

Boardy Barn was often celebrated for its upbeat atmosphere and its signature smiley face stickers, and the Miami New Times called it "the happiest place on earth".

The New York Post estimated that on the Sunday before Memorial Day in 2011, Boardy Barn ran through 600 kegs of Budweiser in seven hours. According to Tony Galgano, one of the owners of Boardy Barn, "They say that if we were open year round, we would sell more beer than at Yankee Stadium in a season."

References

Drinking establishments in New York (state)
1970 establishments in New York (state)